Patrick Sofian Ghigani (born 16 March 1978) is a football manager and footballer who recently played professionally for Persiraja Banda Aceh in Liga Primer Indonesia. He is currently the head coach and a player of Persijap Jepara.

Career 

Born in Munich, Ghigani began playing amateur football with FC Aschheim. His father was Tunisian, and Ghigani played for two seasons in the Tunisian first division with Club Africain. He would return to Germany and join German second division side LR Ahlen for the 2002–03 season, appearing in just one league match due to knee injuries. After a return spell in the Tunisian first division with Stade Tunisien and a spell with German amateurs Kickers Emden, he returned to the German second division with SpVgg Unterhaching. He made 48 league appearances in two seasons with Unterhaching. However, he was released from the club in the summer of 2007, and after spending the remainder of 2007 without a club, he dropped down to play in the Regionalliga with SC Pfullendorf.

In January 2009, Ghigani moved to Greece, joining Rodos F.C. in the third division. After helping the club gain promotion, he stayed in the third division by moving to Panargiakos F.C. for the following season. A move to third division side Panegialios followed.

In late 2012, he decided to return to Germany to play amateur football for SpVgg Feldmoching, having bought a house in Munich.

References

External links 

 

1978 births
Living people
German footballers
Club Africain players
Expatriate footballers in Indonesia
Rot Weiss Ahlen players
Kickers Emden players
SpVgg Unterhaching players
Rodos F.C. players
German people of Tunisian descent
2. Bundesliga players
SC Pfullendorf players
Panegialios F.C. players
Association football midfielders
Footballers from Munich